Madikeri is a hill station town in Madikeri taluk and headquarters of Kodagu district in Karnataka, India.

Etymology 
Madikeri was known as Muddu Raja Keri, which meant Mudduraja's town, was named after the prominent Haleri king Mudduraja who ruled Kodagu from 1633 to 1687. From 1834, during the British Raj, it was called Mercara. It was later renamed to Madikeri by the Government of Mysore.

History 

The history of Madikeri is related to the history of Kodagu. From the 2nd to the 6th century AD, the northern part of Kodagu was ruled by Kadambas. The southern part of Kodagu was ruled by Gangas from the 4th to the 11th century. After defeating the Gangas in the 11th century, Cholas became the rulers of Kodagu. In the 12th century, the Cholas lost Kodagu to the Hoysalas. Kodagu fell to the Vijayanagar kings in the 14th century.

After their fall, the local chieftains like Karnambahu (Palegars) started ruling their areas directly. They were defeated by Haleri Dynasty founder Veeraraju, (Nephew of Ikkeri Sadashiva Nayaka who were descendants of Talakadu Ganga Dynasty). In the year 1700 AD Ikkeri Somashekara Nayaka gifted Puttur and Amara Sullia Magnes of Tulunadu to Haleri Kings. 

Descendants of Veeraraju who are known as "Haleri Dynasty" ruled Kodagu from 1600 to 1834 AD. Haleri king Mudduraja built the Fort in Madikeri and made it as their capital. Mudduraja, the third Haleri king started leveling the land around Madikeri and built a fort in the year 1681. Madikeri Fort which was original built of mud and was replaced by Tipu Sultan. Kodagu became a part of British India after 1834 AD.

P.A. Mohideen is the Municipal President of the city of Madikeri.

Demographics 
 India census, Madikeri had a population of 33,381. Males constitute 57.2% of the population and females 42.8%.  Madikeri had an average literacy rate of 85%, higher than the national average of 69.3: male literacy was 83%, and female literacy 80%. 11% of the population was under 6 years of age.

Geography and climate 
Madikeri lies in the Western Ghats and is a popular hill station. The nearest cities are Hassan to the north, Mangaluru to the west, and Mysuru to the east.

With the onset of the south-west monsoon, the temperature decreases in June and the weather becomes chilly.

Tourist Attractions 
 Raja's Seat
 Sri Omkareshwara Temple
 Madikeri Fort
 Gaddide (Raja's Tomb)
 General Thimmaiah War Museum
 Abbey Falls
 Mandalpatti view point
Pushpagiri wildlife sanctuary destination https://en.m.wikipedia.org/wiki/Pushpagiri_Wildlife_Sanctuary

See also 

 Hassan
 Kodagu Institute of Medical Sciences
 Mangalore
 Sakleshpur
 Kodava
 Talakaveri

References

External links 

 
 Madikeri.org: Portal on Madikeri and Coorg
 Madikeri: History and Architecture

Articles containing potentially dated statements from 2001
All articles containing potentially dated statements
Kodava people
Kodava Takk
Cities and towns in Kodagu district
Populated places in the Western Ghats
Tourism in Karnataka
Hill stations in Karnataka
Hills of Karnataka
Former capital cities in India
Geography of Kodagu district
Tourist attractions in Kodagu district